The 2000 Mr. Olympia contest was an IFBB professional bodybuilding competition held October 20–22, 2000 at the Mandalay Bay Arena in Las Vegas, Nevada.

Results
The total prize money awarded was $325,000.

Notable events
Ronnie Coleman won his third consecutive Mr. Olympia title
Chris Cormier, third-place finisher in 1999, was injured four weeks before the competition

See also
 2000 Ms. Olympia

References

External links 
 Mr. Olympia
 2000 Olympia Weekend coverage

 2000
2000 in American sports
Mr. Olympia 2000
2000 in bodybuilding